This is a list of 104 species in Cubaris, a genus of woodlice in the family Armadillidae.

Cubaris species

 Cubaris acapulcensis 
 Cubaris africana 
 Cubaris albolateralis 
 Cubaris alticola 
 Cubaris ambitiosa 
 Cubaris arcangelii 
 Cubaris barbertoni 
 Cubaris benitensis 
 Cubaris bocki 
 Cubaris bolivari 
 Cubaris boliviana 
 Cubaris brunneocaudata 
 Cubaris caerulea 
 Cubaris californica 
 Cubaris canalensis 
 Cubaris cavernosa 
 Cubaris chiltoni 
 Cubaris cinchonae 
 Cubaris cinerea 
 Cubaris claytonensis 
 Cubaris commensalis 
 Cubaris crenata 
 Cubaris crenatus 
 Cubaris decoui 
 Cubaris dhaliwali 
 Cubaris dilectum 
 Cubaris emunita 
 Cubaris everesti 
 Cubaris expansa 
 Cubaris expansus 
 Cubaris fasciata 
 Cubaris fasciatus 
 Cubaris ferruginea 
 Cubaris ferrugineus 
 Cubaris flavobrunnea 
 Cubaris fragilis 
 Cubaris fritschei 
 Cubaris galbineus 
 Cubaris goweri 
 Cubaris granaria 
 Cubaris granulata 
 Cubaris granulatus 
 Cubaris gravelii 
 Cubaris griseus 
 Cubaris harsadiensis 
 Cubaris helmsiana 
 Cubaris hickmani 
 Cubaris hirsuta 
 Cubaris hirsutus 
 Cubaris howensis 
 Cubaris ignota 
 Cubaris incisus 
 Cubaris insularis 
 Cubaris invenustus 
 Cubaris javanensis 
 Cubaris joliveti 
 Cubaris kashmiri 
 Cubaris lacustris 
 Cubaris lewisae 
 Cubaris lifuensis 
 Cubaris lobata 
 Cubaris lobatus 
 Cubaris longicornis 
 Cubaris lundi 
 Cubaris maculata 
 Cubaris margaritae 
 Cubaris marmorata 
 Cubaris marmoratus 
 Cubaris meermohri 
 Cubaris merulanoides 
 Cubaris minilobus 
 Cubaris minima 
 Cubaris minuta 
 Cubaris mirandai 
 Cubaris miser 
 Cubaris misera 
 Cubaris murina  (little sea pillbug)
 Cubaris nacreum 
 Cubaris nacrum 
 Cubaris nepalensis 
 Cubaris nigroflava 
 Cubaris obliquidens 
 Cubaris oxyzomus 
 Cubaris pacificum 
 Cubaris pacificus 
 Cubaris plasticus 
 Cubaris pongolae 
 Cubaris pronyensis 
 Cubaris pusilla 
 Cubaris pusillus 
 Cubaris robusta 
 Cubaris rufonigra 
 Cubaris sarasini 
 Cubaris schellenbergi 
 Cubaris solidula 
 Cubaris solidulus 
 Cubaris spenceri 
 Cubaris sulcifrons 
 Cubaris suteri 
 Cubaris tamarensis 
 Cubaris tarangensa 
 Cubaris tarangensis 
 Cubaris tasmaniensis 
 Cubaris truncata

References

Articles created by Qbugbot